Lothar Prehn (born 6 October 1946) is a retired German football defender.

References

1946 births
Living people
German footballers
VfB Speldorf players
KFC Uerdingen 05 players
Bundesliga players
2. Bundesliga players
Association football defenders